Horst Dreier (born 7 September 1954) is a German jurist and legal philosopher. He currently holds a chair at the University of Würzburg. In 2008 he was the initial candidate to replace Winfried Hassemer at the Federal Constitutional Court of Germany, but his nomination was opposed by the CDU for his controversial positions regarding torture and stem cell research, and eventually withdrawn in favor of Andreas Voßkuhle.

A native of Hannover, Lower Saxony, Dreier attended the University of Hannover, where he received his Staatsexamen in 1981. He went on to earn his Doctor of Laws from the University of Würzburg in 1985, under supervision of Hasso Hofmann.

Horst Dreier received several awards for his work; in 2000, the "Award for Excellence in Teaching" from the Bavarian State Minister for Science, Research and the Arts and in 2002 he was awarded the Austrian Decoration for Science and Art by the Federal President of the Republic of Austria.

In 2003 Dreier was elected as a member of the Philosophy and History Class of the Bavarian Academy of Sciences and in 2007 he was inducted into the German Academy of Sciences Leopoldina.

Selected publications
English language publications only

.
.

References

External links
Biography at the University of Würzburg

1954 births
Living people
Jurists from Hanover
Recipients of the Austrian Decoration for Science and Art
Carl Schmitt scholars